Ntumba is a Congolese name that may refer to
Given name
Ntumba Luaba, Democratic Republic of the Congo politician
Ntumba Massanka (born 1996), English professional footballer
Surname
Artyom Ntumba (born 2003), Russian football player of Congolese descent
Francis Ntumba Danga (born 1963), Congolese former professional footballer
Gilbert Tshiongo Tshibinkubula wa Ntumba (1942–2021), Congolese engineer, politician, and civil servant
Lévi Ntumba (born 2001), French footballer
Marie Ntumba Nzeza, Congolese politician and diplomat
Nimi a Lukeni a Nzenze a Ntumba (died 1641), ruler of the Kingdom of Kongo
Nkanga a Lukeni a Nzenze a Ntumba (died 1660), ruler of the Kingdom of Kongo
Kongo-language surnames